Meladema coriacea  is a species of beetles belonging to the family Dytiscidae.

Description

The color of the body is shiny black. These water beetles have oval, flattened streamlined bodies adapted for aquatic life. Elytra have short curved striae. Antennae are reddish, and the legs are brown. The hindlegs are adapted for propelling this insect in the water. Adults can be found from April to September.

Habitat
This species lives in streams, rivers and ponds.

Distribution
This species is present in Bulgaria, France, Greece, Italy, Portugal, Spain, Near East and North Africa.

References
 Biolib
 Fauna europaea
 Entomoland

Dytiscidae
Beetles described in 1835